Vaaler or Våler or Valer may refer to:

Places
Våler, Innlandet, a municipality in Innlandet county, Norway
Våler (village), village and administrative center of Våler municipality
Åsnes og Våler, a former municipality in Hedmark county (1849-1854)
Våler, Viken, a municipality in Viken county, Norway
Vålerbanen, a motor racing circuit in Braskereidfoss, Norway

People

Given name
Valer Austin, permaculturalist involved with desert greening
Valer Dorneanu (born 1944), Romanian politician
Valer Săsărman (1969–2021), Romanian professional footballer
Valer Toma (born 1957), Romanian rower

Surname
Johan Vaaler (1866-1910), Norwegian inventor

See also 
 
 

 Valeri (name)
 Valeria (given name)
 Valerian (name)
 Valeriano (name)
 Valerie (given name)
 Valērijs (given name)
 Valerij (given name)
 Valery (name)
 Valeriu (given name)
 Valerius (name)
 Valera (disambiguation)
 Valeria (disambiguation)
 Valerianus (disambiguation)
 Valerie (disambiguation)
 Valérien (disambiguation)
 Vale (disambiguation)